The AfroBasket Women All-Tournament Team is a FIBA award given every two years, awarded to the five strongest competitors throughout the tournament.

Honourees

See also
 FIBA AfroBasket Women Most Valuable Player
 FIBA Women's Basketball World Cup Most Valuable Player
 FIBA Women's Basketball World Cup All-Tournament Team
 FIBA Awards

References

Team
Basketball trophies and awards